Leolo High School is a school situated in Praktiseer, South Africa next to Burgersfort. It is currently headed by Madala William Mathebula. The school provides education for mainly science and commercial streams.

High schools in Mpumalanga
Educational institutions established in 1960
1960 establishments in South Africa